John P. Kee (born John Prince Kee on June 4, 1962) is an American gospel singer and pastor.

Kee has been active for more than 20 years in the music field. He is primarily known for mixing traditional gospel with modern contemporary gospel, and for having a soulful husky voice. Kee is also known as "The Prince of Gospel Music".

Early life and education 
John P. Kee was born on June 4, 1962 Durham, North Carolina. At an early age he began developing his musical talent both instrumentally and vocally. He attended the North Carolina School of the Arts in Winston-Salem. At age 14, he and his brothers, Wayne and Al, moved to California. There he began attending the Yuba College Conservatory School of Music in Marysville, California. During this time, he began playing with various groups such as Cameo. Donald Byrd and the Blackbyrds. 

Due to having a hard time adjusting in California, he moved to Charlotte, North Carolina (only to find himself living in a part of the city known for its violence and drug activities). After watching one of his friends being murdered in a drug deal gone bad, he rededicated his life back to God during a visitation to a revival meeting.

Music career 
In the mid-1980s, Kee formed a community choir in Charlotte known as the New Life Community Choir or "NLCC". Over time, the choir grew in popularity, and has continued to travel throughout the area. The choir also included Kee's own children.

In 1990, Kee founded the Victory in Praise Music and Arts Seminar Mass Choir, or "V.I.P." to fellowship with various ministries, songwriters, musicians and choir directors from all over the country.

In 2007, Kee was inducted into the Christian Music Hall of Fame.

Personal life and ministry 
In December 1995, Kee married Felice Sampson. They are the parents of nine children. His son, Christopher Kee, was selected to join Diddy's live band as a drummer for his upcoming tour of Last Train to Paris (2010).

Kee said that it was during a trip to Michigan with his choir that he received a calling from God to be a preacher. He was in his mid-twenties when he became an ordained minister. 

In 1995, while ministering in Ohio, Kee received a prophetic vision and went forward with the building of a Fellowship Center in Charlotte which could minister to the people in the community. He officially founded the New Life Fellowship Center where he became and remains the senior pastor. The church is located in the same area where he had once led a life of crime and drugs.

Discography 
Solo albums

With choir

Videography 
"It Will Be Alright" – 1990 (VHS)
"Wash Me" – 1991 (VHS)
"We Walk By Faith" – 1994 (VHS)
"Show Up" – 1995 (VHS)
"Stand" – 1996 (VHS) 
"Strength" – 1998 (VHS)
"Not Guilty: The Experience" – 2001 (VHS/DVD)
"Absolutely Live!" (compilation) – 2003 (DVD)

External links 
  New Life City of Praise – Official web site

References 

1962 births
Living people
American gospel singers
Urban contemporary gospel musicians
African-American musicians
Musicians from Durham, North Carolina
American Pentecostals
Members of the Church of God in Christ
Church of God in Christ pastors